The Mode is an album by American saxophonist Sonny Red recorded in 1961 with Grant Green and Barry Harris and released on the Jazzland label.

Reception

Allmusic awarded the album 3 stars, stating: "This vinyl LP isn't a masterpiece, but it's decent and certainly likable."

Track listing
All compositions by Sonny Red except as indicated
 "Moon River" (Henry Mancini, Johnny Mercer) - 6:08  
 "I Like the Likes of You" (Vernon Duke, E.Y. "Yip" Harburg) - 4:19  
 "Super 20" - 5:32 
 "Bye Bye Blues" (Dave Bennett, Chauncey Gray, Fred Hamm, Bert Lown) - 4:30   
 "The Mode" - 9:48
 "Never, Never Land" (Betty Comden, Adolph Green, Jule Styne) - 6:31  
 "Ko-Kee" - 4:12
Recorded at Plaza Sound Studios in New York City on May 29 (tracks 2, 4, 6 & 7) and December 14 (tracks 1, 3 & 5), 1961

Personnel
Sonny Red - alto saxophone
Grant Green - guitar (tracks 1, 3 & 5)
Barry Harris (tracks 1, 3 & 5), Cedar Walton (tracks 2, 4, 6 & 7) - piano
George Tucker - bass
Jimmy Cobb - drums

References

Jazzland Records (1960) albums
Sonny Red albums
1962 albums